Amelia is a census-designated place (CDP) in St. Mary Parish, Louisiana, United States. The population was 2,459 at the 2010 census. It is part of the Morgan City Micropolitan Statistical Area.

History
The first postmaster named the town after Amelia Dupuis, his fiancée, who died shortly before their wedding day.

Geography
Amelia is located at  (29.673361, -91.103181).

On the eastern side of Amelia over Bayou Boeuf is the Assumption Parish line and the unincorporated community of Boeuf, Louisiana.

Demographics

2020 census

As of the 2020 United States census, there were 2,132 people, 904 households, and 522 families residing in the CDP.

2000 census
As of the census of 2000, there were 2,423 people, 766 households, and 549 families residing in the CDP. The racial makeup of the CDP was 58.69% White, 12.38% African American, 0.66% Native American, 22.70% Asian, 4.25% from other races, and 1.32% from two or more races. Hispanic or Latino of any race were 8.17% of the population.

There were 766 households, out of which 38.5% had children under the age of 18 living with them, 55.0% were married couples living together, 9.9% had a female householder with no husband present, and 28.3% were non-families. 20.5% of all households were made up of individuals, and 5.6% had someone living alone who was 65 years of age or older. The average household size was 3.07 and the average family size was 3.60.

In the CDP, the population was spread out, with 31.6% under the age of 18, 10.1% from 18 to 24, 30.7% from 25 to 44, 20.6% from 45 to 64, and 6.9% who were 65 years of age or older. The median age was 31 years. For every 100 females, there were 123.3 males. For every 100 females age 18 and over, there were 129.5 males.

The median income for a household in the CDP was $26,953, and the median income for a family was $29,063. Males had a median income of $30,313 versus $16,917 for females. The per capita income for the CDP was $9,483. About 29.6% of families and 32.5% of the population were below the poverty line, including 38.9% of those under age 18 and 39.9% of those age 65 or over.

References

Census-designated places in Louisiana
Census-designated places in St. Mary Parish, Louisiana